Salhieh  is a  village in the Sidon District of the South Governorate in Lebanon.

History
In 1838, Eli Smith noted  es-Salihiyeh,  as a village located in "Aklim et-Tuffah, adjacent to Seida".

In 1875 Victor Guérin traveled in the region, and noted: "I go up to Salhaieh, through gardens planted with fig trees, olive trees and mulberry trees. It is located on a beautiful and high hill, 2 kilometers west-northwest of Kefr Djerra. Its population exceeds 400 inhabitants, Maronites or United Greeks. The church and a number of houses are newly built, with more or less regular stones that have been partly found on site. A spring collected under an ogival vault is next to several ancient tombs."

References

Bibliography

External links
Salhiyeh (Saida), Localiban 

Populated places in Sidon District
Maronite Christian communities in Lebanon